The Symphony No. 1 in D major, D 82, was composed by Franz Schubert in 1813, when he was just 16 years old. Despite his youth, his first symphony is an impressive piece of orchestral music for both its time and size. The first movement opens with a stately Adagio introduction, reminiscent of Joseph Haydn's 104th symphony in its format. The short Adagio sets off a lively Allegro vivace.

The symphony is scored for 1 flute, 2 oboes, 2 clarinets in A, 2 bassoons, 2 horns in D, 2 trumpets in D, timpani and strings. The orchestration, which is balanced between strings and winds, lends itself to small chamber orchestras, as well as larger ensembles. The trumpets are scored particularly high, as in many of Schubert's early works. Trumpet players will find, in general, the tessitura sitting between D4 and A5 (as sounded) for most of the first and fourth movements. In the fourth movement, Schubert pushes them up to a high D6, in a repeated fashion. Some careful planning is needed to balance the multiple doublings between horns and trumpets.

The standard four movement work runs about 26 minutes.

External links 
 

1813 compositions
No. 01
Compositions in D major